Daniel García Soto is a Puerto Rican professional wrestler best known by his ring name Stefano.

Soto wrestles for promotions across Puerto Rico including International Wrestling Association, World Wrestling Council and New Wrestling Stars. Soto would also make an appearance in America's Total Nonstop Action Wrestling as a storyline lawyer for The Latin American Xchange faction.

Soto also became one of the first wrestlers in Puerto Rican Wrestling to win the triple-crown of the three different Puerto Rican jr. heavyweight titles after winning IWA's Jr. Heavyweight, WWC's Jr. Heavyweight (5 November 2005), and finally NWS Cruiserweight title; which he won on 10 September 2006. After almost a year in WWC, Stefy returned to the IWA in 2008 under his Rabia character and renamed as Xtefy.

Championships and accomplishments
International Wrestling Association
IWA Hardcore Championship (5 times)
IWA World Junior Heavyweight Championship (3 times)
IWA World Tag Team Championship (1 time) - with Chicano
New Wrestling Stars
NWS Cruiserweight Championship (1 time) 
World Wrestling Council
WWC World Junior Heavyweight Championship (2 times) 
World Wrestling League
WWL World Trios Championship (1 time) - with Noel Rodriguez and Dennis Rivera

See also
Professional wrestling in Puerto Rico

References

Living people
Puerto Rican male professional wrestlers
Year of birth missing (living people)